Raden Ngabei Yasadipura Tus Pajang, better known as Yasadipura I (1729–1802), was a poet from the Surakarta Sunanate in present-day Java.

Biography 
Yasadipura was born "Bagus Banjar". His father was Tumenggung Padmanegara, the regent of Pekalongan. His father was a descendant of Sultan Hadiwijaya, the King of Pajang. Yasadipura I studied with Kyai Honggomoyo, a scholar from the Magelang hermitage.

Yasadipura I died in 1802, which was also the birth year of his great-grandson, Ranggawarsita. Later, Ranggawarsita inherited the legacy of Yasadipuran from his grandfather, Yasadipura II.

Yasadipura I is buried in the  area, about 15 km west of Surakarta.

Famous works 
Yasadipura I is considered to be the greatest of poet Java Island during the 18th century. His works include:

 Serat Rama, adapted from Kakawin Ramayana
 Serat Bratayuda, adapted from Kakawin Bharatayuddha
 Fiber Mintaraga, adaptation of Kakawin Arjuna Wiwaha
 Serat Arjuna Sasrabahu, adapted from Kakawin Arjuna Wijaya
These were composed in the form of macapat poetry in the new Javanese language. Some of his verses are still often uttered as suluk by the puppeteers in wayang performances to this day.

Yasadipura I's works also included tales with mystical and Islamic themes often derived from Malay texts. One such work is Serat Ambiya, which was a Javanese adaptation of the Stories of the Prophets.  Another work is Serat Menak, an adaptation of Hikayat Amir Hamzah in Malay. This story tells of the heroism of Hamza ibn Abdul-Muttalib, the uncle of the Prophet Muhammad.

References

Bibliography 
 Andjar Any. 1980. Raden Ngabehi Ranggawarsita. What Happened Ranggawarsita? Semarang: Various Sciences
 M.C. Ricklefs. 1991. History of Modern Indonesia (trans.). Yogyakarta: Gadjah Mada University Press

1802 deaths
Indonesian writers
Javanese poets
18th-century poets
1729 births